Endre is a Hungarian boy name, its origin is from old Greek, can be given by name and surname. Its English form is Andrew.

Endre may refer to:

People

Hungary 
Endre is a Hungarian masculine given name. It is a Hungarian form of Andrew and may refer to:

 Endre Ady, poet
 Endre Elekes, Olympic wrestler
 Endre Gerelyes, novelist, short story writer, Hungarian literature professor
 Endre Hadik-Barkóczy, politician
 Endre Kabos, three-time Olympic champion saber fencer
 Endre Steiner, chess player
 Endre Szemerédi, mathematician
 Endre Penovác, artist, painter

Norway 
 Endre Fotland Knudsen, Norwegian football midfielder
 Endre Nordli, Norwegian handball player

Places 
 Endre, Gotland, a settlement on the island of Gotland, Sweden

Hungarian masculine given names